

Rocket Experiments
During the Cold War, when the area was part of East Germany, the eastern part of the Zingst peninsula on the German Baltic Sea coast in Mecklenburg-Western Pomerania was a restricted military area, used for meteorological rocket experiments. Various experiments were conducted between 1970 and 1992 in an area known as Sundi Meadows. There were 5 launches of the Polish rocket Meteor 1E in the early 1970s. On 21 October 1988 launches of Russian of the MMR06-M type rockets began. The restricted area measured just 23.6 kilometres by 25.5 kilometres. As the rockets reached heights up to 80 kilometres, the launch angle of the unguided rockets had to be determined with an accuracy of 2 degrees in order to prevent an impact outside the restricted area.

The first launches of MMR06-M rockets were not successful due to various technical difficulties. The first successful launch with a meteorological payload occurred on 12 April 1989. Additional launches continued for a short time after the fall of the Berlin Wall and German reunification (3 October 1990). They were finally ended on 19 December 1990 for safety and technological reasons.

Nevertheless, between 14 February and 10 April 1992 a total of 19 Russian rockets of the MMR06-M type were launched at Zingst, of which 6 were successful. Although further rockets were still available for testing, the launches of MMR06-M rockets in Zingst were stopped in April 1992 because of the removal of German Federal Armed Forces from the place.

List of Launches

Remarks: S = Success; PS = Partial Success; F = Failure; EF = Experiment Failure

External links 
 Website with further information and photographs
 List at Astronautix.com (English)
 Further lists at Astronautix.com (English)

Rocket launch sites in Germany
German military aviation
Transport in East Germany
Meteorology in history
Zingst
Science and technology in East Germany
East Germany–Soviet Union relations
East Germany–Poland relations
Meteorology in the Soviet Union